Kukenan Falls (or Salto Kukenan, Kukenaam, Cuquenan or similar) is the second tallest major waterfall in Venezuela after Angel Falls. It is also the second tallest free-leaping waterfall in the world. Overall, it is usually cited as the 11th highest waterfall in the world.

The Kukenan Tepui is located near Mount Roraima, which serves as the geographical marker of the border between Brazil, Venezuela, and Guyana. Mount Roraima also hosts its own waterfall, usually referred to as Roraima Falls, which leaps off the tepui in four tiered leaps.

References

Waterfalls of Venezuela
Geography of Bolívar (state)